John Robitaille (born August 14, 1948) is an American politician and businessman. He was the Republican party nominee in the 2010 election for Governor of Rhode Island, which he lost to independent candidate Lincoln Chafee on November 2, 2010.

Early life
John Robitaille was born on August 14, 1948 in Central Falls and was the second of three children of Roland and Alice Robitaille. They were Catholics whose ancestry traced back to French-led Canada. The Robitaille family moved to North Attleboro when John was six years old.

Robitaille graduated from North Attleboro High School in 1966 and from Providence College in 1970 with a Bachelor of Science in Business Management. During college, Robitaille was a member of the ROTC and Pershing Rifles. He continued his education at the University of Utah from 1974 to 1976 with a Master of Science in Human Resource Management degree.

Military service
Robitaille served in the United States Army as an officer from 1970 to 1976. He was recognized for his distinguished performance as the most outstanding second lieutenant commissioned in the US Army through the ROTC program nationally. He was a paratrooper where he served in Germany with the First Armored Division and later with Headquarters Special Forces Command at Ft. Bragg where he was promoted to the rank of captain.

Private sector
After his time in the military, Robitaille worked in labor and employee relations. From 1976 to 1981, Robitaille worked as an Employee Relations Manager for Frito Lay. From 1981 to 1986, he worked as an Area Manager in Labor Relations for Continental Can Company. From 1985 to 1987, he worked in public relations and communications from as General Manager for Total Communications. In April 1987, Robitaille founded his own small business. He was the President and CEO of Perspective Communications Group in Middletown, Rhode Island.
In 2008, Robitaille left the company to work for Rhode Island Governor Donald Carcieri, where he served as his Senior Advisor of Communications.

Political career

2010 gubernatorial election

Robitaille first became involved in Rhode Island electoral politics in 2006 when he ran for State Representative but lost by four votes to Amy Rice (D-RI). In December 2009, Robitaille announced his decision to run for Rhode Island governor as a Republican. He resigned from his position as Senior Advisor of Communications for Governor Carcieri in order to campaign full-time.

Robitaille initially polled in single digits compared to Democratic nominee Frank Caprio and Republican-turned-Independent candidate Lincoln Chafee, but managed to take a lead over Caprio and come within the margin of error to Chafee. Chafee won the election with 36% of the vote, compared to Robitaille's 34% and Caprio's 23%.

Personal life
Robitaille lives in Charleston, South Carolina with his wife Lynda. He has three children from his first marriage and five grandchildren.

References

External links
 

1948 births
Businesspeople from Rhode Island
Living people
People from Central Falls, Rhode Island
People from Portsmouth, Rhode Island
Providence College alumni
Rhode Island Republicans
University of Utah alumni
Candidates in the 2010 United States elections